11 Lacertae is a star in the northern constellation of Lacerta. It is visible to the naked eye as a faint orange-hued star with an apparent visual magnitude of 4.46. It lies at a distance of about 333 light years and has an absolute magnitude -0.54. The object is moving closer to the Earth with a heliocentric radial velocity of −10.9 km/s.

This is an evolved giant star with a stellar classification of K2.5 III. It is a red clump giant, meaning it is fusing helium in its core after passing through the red giant branch. The star is 3.2 billion years old with 1.38 times the mass of the Sun and has expanded to 27.7 times the Sun's radius. It is radiating 204 times the Sun's luminosity from its enlarged photosphere at an effective temperature of 4,352 K.

References

K-type giants
Horizontal-branch stars
Lacerta (constellation)
BD+43 4266
Lacertae, 11
214868
111944
8632